Guizhou Daily or Guizhou Ribao is the largest provincial newspaper by readership of the southern Chinese province of Guizhou. It is the official newspaper of the Guizhou Provincial Committee of the Chinese Communist Party (中共贵州省委). The paper was launched on November 28, 1949, under the name of Xinqian Daily (新黔日报), and was renamed to its present name on 1 January 1957.

Founded after the Chinese Civil War, both Guizhou Daily and the Guiyang Daily (贵阳日报) formed the main basis of communication across the province. In recent years, popularity has given way to its subsidiaries:
 Guizhou Business Daily
 Guizhou Metropolitan Daily
 China Western Development Report
 Economic Information Times
 New Times
 Tianxia Digest
 News Window 
However, the paper remains an important source for provincial Party affairs. It recently completed a move into its new skyline building.

References

External links
Guizhou Daily Homepage (Chinese)

Chinese-language newspapers (Simplified Chinese)
Daily newspapers published in China
Culture in Guizhou
Mass media in Guiyang